Ulva profunda is a species of seaweed in the family Ulvaceae that can be found in US state of Florida, India, and the island of Mauritius.

References

Further reading

Ulvaceae
Plants described in 1928
Flora of Florida
Flora of India (region)
Flora of Mauritius